Amparo Caicedo Mina (born 30 January 1965) is a Colombian sprinter. She competed in the women's 100 metres at the 1988 Summer Olympics.

References

External links
 

1965 births
Living people
Athletes (track and field) at the 1987 Pan American Games
Athletes (track and field) at the 1988 Summer Olympics
Colombian female sprinters
Olympic athletes of Colombia
Pan American Games competitors for Colombia
World Athletics Championships athletes for Colombia
Place of birth missing (living people)
Central American and Caribbean Games medalists in athletics
Olympic female sprinters
20th-century Colombian women
21st-century Colombian women